Fer is a genus of grasshoppers in the subfamily Catantopinae, not assigned to any tribe.  Species can be found in southern China and Vietnam.

Species
The Orthoptera Species File lists:
 Fer bimaculiformis You & Li, 1983
 Fer coeruleipennis Bolívar, 1918 - type species
 Fer guangxiensis Jiang & Zheng, 1994
 Fer nigripennis Zheng & Xie, 2007
 Fer nonmaculiformis Zheng, Lian & Xi, 1985
 Fer yunnanensis Huang & Xia, 1984

References

External Links 
 

Acrididae genera
Catantopinae 
Orthoptera of Indo-China